"Candle of Life" is a song by the progressive rock band the Moody Blues, from their album To Our Children's Children's Children, a concept album about space travel.  "Candle of Life" was written by bassist John Lodge, and features both Lodge and Justin Hayward on vocals.

After its release on To Our Children's Children's Children, "Candle of Life" was released several months later as the B-side of "Question," the hit single from The Moody Blues' following album A Question of Balance.

Personnel
 Justin Hayward – vocals, acoustic guitar
 John Lodge – vocals, bass guitar
 Mike Pinder – Mellotron, piano, backing vocals
 Ray Thomas – backing vocals
 Graeme Edge – drums, percussion

External links
 

1969 songs
The Moody Blues songs
Songs written by John Lodge (musician)